Axiopoena karelini is a moth of the family Erebidae. It was described by Édouard Ménétries in 1863. It is found in Sochi, Abkhazia, Georgia, Armenia, Azerbaijan, eastern Turkey and northern Iraq.

References

Callimorphina
Moths described in 1863
Moths of Asia